Tibor Kincses (born 12 February 1960 in Kecskemét) is a Hungarian former judoka who competed in the 1980 Summer Olympics.

Later career
Later after finishing his athletic career, Mr. Kincses worked with the PR & Communication Department of AIBA, and then he was appointed PR & Communication Director of the Asian Boxing Confederation (ASBC)

References

Links
Mr. Tibor Kincses officially appointed as ASBC PR & Communication Director

1960 births
Living people
Hungarian male judoka
Olympic judoka of Hungary
Judoka at the 1980 Summer Olympics
Olympic bronze medalists for Hungary
Olympic medalists in judo
Medalists at the 1980 Summer Olympics
People from Kecskemét
Sportspeople from Bács-Kiskun County
20th-century Hungarian people
21st-century Hungarian people